Shipol (in Albanian) or Šipolje (in Serbian: Шипоље) is a settlement in the municipality of Mitrovica in the District of Mitrovica, Kosovo. According to the 2011 census, it has 4,834 inhabitants.

Demography 

In 2011 census, the village had in total 4,834 inhabitants, from whom 4818 (99,67 %) were Albanians, two Bosniaks, one Serb and one other. 12 were not available.

Notes

References 

Villages in Mitrovica, Kosovo